The Icelandic Men's Handball Cup (Icelandic: Bikarkeppni karla í handknattleik), also known as the Coca-Cola Cup since 2013 for sponsorship reasons, is an annual handball competition between clubs in Iceland. It is run by the Icelandic Handball Association.

The current title holders are Fimleikafélag Hafnarfjarðar who won their 6th title on 9 March 2019.

Titles 

Source

References

External links
 Icelandic Handball Association 

Handball competitions in Iceland